It's Time for Dave Pike is the debut album led by American jazz vibraphonist Dave Pike which was recorded in 1961 for the Riverside label.

Reception

The contemporaneous DownBeat reviewer praised the spirit of Pike's playing, while identifying reservations: "he doesn't always follow through on ideas, cramming too much into one solo. He has a little trouble bringing his solos to a conclusion". The AllMusic site awarded the album 3 stars stating "By 1961 standards, this album isn't experimental or forward-thinking – certainly not compared to some of the adventurous, challenging sounds that were coming from modal and avant-garde improvisers in the early '60s. But it's easy to enjoy if you appreciate swinging, inspired bop along the lines of Milt Jackson, who is one of Pike's primary influences".

Track listing
All compositions by Dave Pike except as indicated
 "Cheryl" (Charlie Parker) - 5:02     
 "On Green Dolphin Street" (Bronisław Kaper, Ned Washington) - 5:34     
 "It's Time" - 5:40     
 "Hot House" (Tadd Dameron) - 4:08     
 "Forward" - 5:12     
 "Solar" (Miles Davis) - 3:14     
 "Little Girl Blue" (Lorenz Hart, Richard Rodgers) - 3:55     
 "Tendin' to Business" (Don Cherry) - 5:04

Personnel 
Dave Pike - vibraphone  
Barry Harris - piano (tracks 1-6 & 8)
Reggie Workman - bass (tracks 1-6 & 8)
Billy Higgins - drums (tracks 1-6 & 8)

References 

1961 debut albums
Dave Pike albums
Riverside Records albums
Albums produced by Orrin Keepnews